East Coast Basketball League (ECBL) is a men's professional basketball minor league in the United States that began play in March 2015. The league is centered in the Carolinas with teams also in Georgia, Virginia, Maryland, Pennsylvania, Connecticut and Massachusetts.

History 
Five teams (Carolina Gladiators, Fayetteville Crossover, PrimeTime Players, Queen City Express, South Carolina All-Stars) in the ECBL previously played in the Tobacco Road Basketball League. The teams broke away from the TRBL due to changes in the league format.

On August 16, 2014, the ECBL announced the addition of the Fort Gordon Eagles. A military team, the Eagles also compete in the Southeast Military Athletics Conference (SEMAC) from October to February.

Former American Basketball Association team Savannah Storm were admitted to enter the ECBL for Season 1. They would be joined by Columbia Crusaders, Gastonia Crowns and High Point Hawks to round out the 10-team circuit.

The first-ever ECBL Championship was won by PrimeTime Players, 130-113 over the Fayetteville Crossover. The final was played on June 27, 2015 in Fort Mill, South Carolina and streamed live online. Former Catawba College forward Donald Rutherford scored 34 points while grabbing 16 rebounds for PrimeTime and was named game MVP.

Four new teams joined the ECBL for the 2016 season: expansion teams Carolina MPact, Petersburg Revolution, RDU Raptors and Winston-Salem Certified (formerly of the TRBL).

Expansion into Charlotte was announced on April 8, 2016, with the addition of Charlotte Golden Bulls.

At the August 2016 AGM, league board of directors unanimously accepted the expansion application of the Florence Wildcats for 2017. Two teams also announced name changes: Peterburg Cavaliers (formerly Revolution) and North Carolina Coyotes (formerly RDU Raptors).

League owners approved the expansion application of the Carolina Thunder for 2017. The Thunder began as a travel team playing a league schedule on the road. A second travel team, Hickory Hoyas, were added to the schedule before the season opener.

Prior to the 2021 season the league added seven teams to form the new Mid-Atlantic Conference. Teams included Fredericksburg Grizzlies, Hub City Hogs, Philly Cannons, Philly Raiders, Plaistow Shockers, Red Rose Thunder and Western Mass Zombies.

Teams

Former teams 
 Augusta Eagles (2015–20)
 Carolina Gladiators (2015)
Carolina Kings (2017)
 Carolina MPact (2016)
 Carolina Showtime (2017; 2020)
 Charlotte Golden Bulls (2017)
C-Port Trojans (2015–18)
East Carolina Cardinals (2018–19)
 Fayetteville Crossover (2015–16)
Fredericksburg Grizzlies (2021)
 Gastonia Crowns (2015)
Georgia Fire (2020–21)
 Hickory Hoyas (2017–19; 2020–present) - Suspended from league in 2019 after four games. Returned in 2020.
 High Point Hawks (2015–17)
Philly Cannons (2021)
 Queen City Express (2015)
South Carolina All Stars (2015–18)
Winston-Salem Certified (2016–18)

Champions

ECBL Super Cup 
Winners of the ECBL Mid-Atlantic and ECBL South.

References

External links 
 Official league website

Basketball leagues in the United States
Professional sports leagues in the United States
2014 establishments in the United States
Sports leagues established in 2014